The English Cocker Spaniel is a breed of gun dog. It is noteworthy for producing one of the most varied numbers of pups in a litter among all dog breeds. The English Cocker Spaniel is an active, good-natured, sporting dog standing well up at the withers and compactly built. There are "field" or "working" cockers and "house" cockers. It is one of several varieties of spaniel and is the foundation of its American cousin, the American Cocker Spaniel. The English Cocker is closer to the working-dog form of the Field Spaniel and the English Springer Spaniel.

Outside the US, the breed is usually known simply as the Cocker Spaniel, as is the American Cocker Spaniel within the US. The word cocker is commonly held to stem from their use to hunt woodcocks. The breed can have litters of anywhere from 3 to 12 puppies.

History 

Spaniel type dogs have been found in art and literature for almost 500 years. Initially, spaniels in England were divided among land spaniels and water spaniels. The differentiation among the spaniels that led to the breeds that we see today did not begin until the mid-19th century. During this time, the land spaniels became a bit more specialised and divisions among the types were made based upon weight. According to the 1840 Encyclopedia of Rural Sports, Cockers were 12–20 lb (5.5–9 kg). At this time it was not uncommon for Cockers and Springers to come from the same litter. Even a puppy from a "Toy" sized lineage could grow to be a springer.

There is no indication from these early sources that spaniels were used to retrieve games. Rather they were used to drive the game toward the guns.

During the 1850s and 1860s, other types of Cockers were recorded. There were Welsh Springer Spaniels and Devonshire Cockers. Additionally, small dogs from Sussex Spaniel litters were called Cockers. In 1874 the first stud books were published by the newly formed kennel club. Any spaniel under 25 lb (11 kg) was placed in the Cocker breeding pool, however, the Welsh Cocker was reclassified as a Springer in 1903 due to its larger size and shorter ear. "...in those days only those dogs up to a hard day's work and sensible specimens were allowed to live, as absolute sporting purposes were about their only enjoyment and dog shows were hardly heard of...".

The sport of conformation showing began in earnest among spaniels after the Spaniel Club was formed in 1885. When showing, the new Springer and Cocker, both were in the same class until The Spaniel Club created breed standards for each of the types. The Kennel Club separated the two types eight years later. Since then, the Springer and Cocker enthusiasts have bred in the separate traits that they desired. Today, the breed differs in more ways than weight alone.

At Crufts, the English Cocker Spaniel has been the most successful breed in winning Best in Show, winning on a total of seven occasions between 1928 and 2009, with wins in 1930, 1931, 1938, 1939, 1948, 1950 and 1996. In addition, the breed makes up three of the four winners who have won the title on more than one occasion with all three coming from H. S. Lloyd's Ware kennel. Due to World War II, the English Cocker Spaniel managed to be the only breed to have won the title between 1938 and 1950, although the competition was only held on four occasions during that period. The most recent best in show was Sh. Ch. Canigou Cambrai in 1996.

Field Spaniel 
In the late 19th century with the increase in popularity of dog shows and the creation of standards for various breeds, the Spaniel family began to split into various different breeds. A group of enthusiasts decided to create a large black spaniel breed. Four dogs would act as progenitors for this new breed, of which two were Cocker Spaniels, one was a Cocker Spaniel/English Water Spaniel cross and one was a Norfolk Spaniel. This new breed was named the Field Spaniel, and was recognised by the Kennel Club in 1892.

American Cocker Spaniel 

The American Cocker Spaniel was developed from the English Cocker Spaniel in the 19th century to retrieve quails and woodcocks. They were originally divided from the English Cocker solely on a size basis but were bred over the years for different specific traits. The two Cocker Spaniels were shown together in America until 1936, when the English Cocker received status as a separate breed. The American Kennel Club granted a separate breed designation for the English Cocker Spaniel in 1946. The American breed has a shorter snout, is more likely to get ear infections, and is groomed differently from the English Cocker.

Description 
The English Cocker Spaniel is a sturdy, compact and well-balanced dog. It has a characteristic expression showing intelligence and alertness. Its eyes should be dark and its lobular ears should reach "a bit past" the tip of the nose when pulled forward. Today, a significant difference in appearance exists between field-bred and conformation show-bred dogs. The Cocker's tail is customarily docked in North America. In countries where docking is legal, the tail is generally docked at about 4–5 inches (10–13 cm) in field-bred dogs while show dogs are generally docked closer to the body. Docking is now illegal in Australia and South Africa. In England and Wales, docking can only be carried out on dogs where the owners have proved that the dogs will be used as working or shooting dogs.

The English Cocker Spaniel is similar to the English Springer Spaniel and at first glance, the only major difference is the larger size of the Springer. However, English Cockers also tend to have longer, and lower-set ears than English Springers. In addition Springers also tend to have a longer muzzle, their eyes are not as prominent and the coat is less abundant.

Colour 

Breed standards restrict all breeds of dogs to certain colours for the purposes of conformation showing (dependent on country). For example, the breed standard of the United Kingdom's Kennel Club states that in solid colours, no white is allowed except for a small amount on the chest and the American Kennel Club has standards for features including the expression, neck, topline, and body. In working Cockers, breeders value working ability over the colour of the dog.

They come in solid (or "self"), parti-coloured and roan types of markings. Solid dogs have no or very little white. Parti-coloured dogs have spots or patches of colour on a white dog. Parti-coloured dogs can have freckles of colour on their nose and legs called "ticking." Roan is an extreme version of ticking and consists of the white dog parts of a dog being speckled with the same colour as the solid patches. Roan puppies are born white with coloured patches and the white becomes roan as they grow up, similar to the spots on Dalmatians.

Solid English Cocker colours can come in black, liver/brown, red/golden with black or brown pigmentation and Parti-coloured cockers come in blue roan, liver roan, orange roan with black or brown pigmentation, lemon roan with black or brown pigmentation, black and white ticked, liver and white ticked, orange and white ticked with black or brown pigmentation, lemon and white ticked with black or brown pigmentation, black and white, liver and white with brown pigmentation, orange and white with black or brown pigmentation, lemon and white with black or brown pigmentation. All of these colours can also have Tan-points, although you probably won't see it on any red, gold or lemon Cocker because it will blend in.

Of the solid colours, sable is considered rare and controversial and is classified by some countries as being a type of parti-colour on account of its mixed hair shafts. While some have claimed this colour is from a cross with a different breed, geneticists have discovered English Cocker sable is unique to this breed. In addition, a silver/ash colour, usually associated with the Weimaraner dog, is considered genetically possible but is yet to be recorded by the United Kingdom's Kennel Club. Of the roan varieties, lemon roan with a light brown pigmentation is the most recessive of all the roans. Plain white Cockers are rarely born and are thought to be more prone to deafness than those with more pigmentation. As such they are generally not encouraged in the breed.

Temperament 

Cockers are compassionate, determined, kind, intelligent, athletic, alert and resilient and make great family pets. The breed does not like being alone, and will bond strongly to an individual person in a family, usually the one who feeds it. Known for optimism, intelligence and adaptability, the breed is extremely loyal and affectionate. The English Cocker Spaniel has a cheerful nature. They rank 18th in Stanley Coren's The Intelligence of Dogs, being of excellent working/obedience intelligence. Due to the breed's happy disposition and continuously wagging tail, it has been given the nickname "merry cocker". They can also be dominant but loyal to their companion.

With a good level of socialisation at an early age, Cocker Spaniels can get along well with people, children, other dogs and other pets. This breed seems to have a perpetually wagging tail and prefers to be around people; it is not best suited to the backyard alone. Cockers can be easily stressed by loud noises and by rough treatment or handling. When trained with a soft hand and plentiful rewards, the Cocker Spaniel will be an obedient and loving companion with a happy, cheerful nature.

Health 

English Cocker Spaniels in the UK, USA and Canada have an average lifespan of 12–15 years.

In a 2004 UK Kennel Club survey, the most common causes of death were cancer (30%), old age (17%), cardiac (9%), and "combinations" (7%).

In 1998 and 2002 USA/Canada Health Surveys, the leading causes of death were old age (40%) and cancer (22%).

Common health issues with English Cockers are bite problems, skin allergies, shyness, cataracts, deafness (affecting 6.3% of the dogs of this breed), aggression towards other dogs, and benign tumours.

Some uncommon health issues that can also have an effect on English Cocker Spaniels include canine hip dysplasia, patellar luxation, canine dilated cardiomyopathy, and heart murmurs. Hip dysplasia is an abnormal formation of the hip joint which is the most common cause of canine arthritis in the hips. Patellar Lunation, also known as luxating patella, refers to the dislocation of the kneecap. Canine dilated cardiomyopathy is an adult-onset condition which occurs when the heart muscle is weak and does not contract properly. It can lead to congestive heart failure, which is where fluid accumulates in the lungs, chest, abdominal cavities, or under the skin. Dilated cardiomyopathy is often accompanied by abnormal heart rhythms, or arrhythmias which can complicate treatment. Cocker Spaniels can present with a nutritional form of dilated cardiomyopathy that is associated with low blood concentrations of the amino acid taurine. This form of dilated cardiomyopathy is in many cases reversible if the dog receives taurine supplementation.

Rage syndrome 
Rage syndrome is most often associated with the Show Cocker Spaniel breed, although, cases have been found in other breeds and cases are relatively rare even within the Cocker Spaniel breed. Rage syndrome is described as when a dog attacks suddenly and often savagely, without any warning and during the attack the dog often has a glazed look and appears to be unaware of its surroundings. Rage Syndrome can affect any and all breeds. Though not a common ailment, studies have found it is more common in solid coloured Cockers than in parti-colours and also more common in darker coloured Cockers than lighter coloured Cockers, being most common in solid gold and black coloured spaniels. Their health issues are typical for a purebred dog breed; however, they are closely associated with rage syndrome even though cases are really quite rare. Rage syndrome cannot be accurately predicted and can only be diagnosed by EEG or genetic testing and these tests are not conclusive.

A link between coat colour and temperament has been proposed. This link could be the colour pigment melanin, which is biochemically similar to chemicals that act as transmitters in the brain. A study made by the University of Cambridge involving over 1,000 Cocker Spaniel households throughout Britain concluded that solid colour Cockers were more likely to be aggressive in 12 out of 13 situations. Red/golden Cockers were shown to be the most aggressive of all, in situations involving strangers, and family members, while being disciplined, and sometimes for no apparent reason. A study by Spanish researchers at the Autonomous University of Barcelona revealed a similar link between golden Cockers and aggression. Males were also more likely to be aggressive. The study found the English Cocker Spaniel to have the highest level of owner-directed aggression compared to other breeds.

Working Cockers 

 
This breed, like many others with origins as working dogs, has some genetic lines that focus on working-dog skills and other lines that focus on ensuring that the dog's appearance conforms to a breed standard; these are referred to as the "working" (or "field-bred") and "conformation" strains, respectively. After World War II, Cocker Spaniels bred for pets and for the sport of conformation showing increased enormously in popular appeal, and, for a while, was the most numerous Kennel Club registered breed. This popularity increased the view that all Cockers were useless as working dogs. However, for most dogs this is untrue, as even some show-bred Cockers have retained their working instinct.

Today, this breed is experiencing a resurgence in usage as a working and hunting dog. Dogs from working lines are noticeably distinct in appearance. As is the case with the English Springer Spaniel, the working type has been bred exclusively to perform in the field as a hunting companion. Their coat is shorter and ears less pendulous than the show-bred type. Although registered as the same breed, the two strains have diverged significantly enough that they are rarely crossed. The dogs that have dominated the hunt test, field trial and hunting scene in the United States are field-bred dogs from recently imported English lines. Working-dog lines often have physical characteristics that would prevent them from winning in the show ring. This is a result of selecting different traits than those selected by show breeders. The longer coat and ears, selected for the show ring, are an impediment in the field. Cuban authorities train and use English Cocker Spaniels as sniffer dogs to check for drugs or food products in passengers' baggage at Cuban airports.

Skills 
A field-bred cocker spaniel is first and foremost an upland flushing dog. In performing this task there are some skills the dog must be trained to perform.
 Hup This is the traditional command to sit and stay. To be an effective hunter the dog must comply with this command absolutely. When this command is given, the dog can be given directions called to the handler. The ability to hup a dog actively working a running bird allows the handler and any gunners to keep up without having to run.
 Retrieve to Hand The majority of hunters and all hunt test or field trial judges require that a dog deliver a bird to hand, meaning that a dog will hold the bird until told to give it to the hunter directly.
 Quarter Dogs must work in a pattern in front of the hunter seeking upland game birds. The dog must be taught to stay within gun range to avoid flushing a bird outside of shooting distance.
 Follow Hand Signals Upland hunting involves pursuing wild game in its native habitat. Gun dogs must investigate likely covers for upland game birds. The dog must be responsive to hand signals in order for the hunter to be able to direct the dog into areas of particular interest.
 Steady When hunting upland birds, a flushing dog should be steady to wing and shot, meaning that he sits when a bird rises or a gun is fired. He does this in order to mark the fall and to avoid flushing other birds when pursuing a missed bird.

In literature and film
Elizabeth Barrett Browning wrote two poems to her red cocker spaniel Flush, "To Flush, My Dog" and "Flush or Faunus".

Flush: A Biography is a semi-fictional biography of Browning's red cocker spaniel written by Virginia Woolf and published in 1933.

The 1930 play The Barretts of Wimpole Street by the Dutch/English dramatist Rudolf Besier also had Browning's red cocker spaniel as a central character. The play was adapted to two film versions in 1934 and 1957, a musical (Robert and Elizabeth), and a 1982 TV film The Barretts of Wimpole Street made by the BBC.

Jasper is a cocker spaniel which features in the 1938 Daphne du Maurier novel Rebecca.

Garden and Gun Magazine has featured English cockers on the cover of its Sporting South issues several times.

An English cocker is prominently featured in several episodes of James Herriot's All Creatures Great and Small on PBS.

Trivia
William, Prince of Wales and Catherine, Princess of Wales owned an English Cocker Spaniel called Lupo, bred from Ella, a dog owned by her parents Michael and Carole Middleton. He was a working-type English Cocker Spaniel. Lupo was born in a litter just prior to Christmas 2011.

Following the birth of Prince George of Wales, Lupo was featured in one of the first official photographs. He was subsequently featured in a family portrait with the Duke and Duchess and Prince George in March 2014.

The annual Broadmoor Resort dog parade, which has been held for more than 75 years during the July 4th celebration, has regularly awarded English Cocker Spaniels as "Best Behaved" in the competition

See also
 Dogs portal
 List of dog breeds

References

Further reading 
 
 Roettger, Anthony. Urban Gun Dogs: Training Flushing Dogs for Home and Field, The Writer's Collective, 2004. 
 
 Grainger, Alexandra. Training your Cocker...Whilst Playing with Children. Complete Owner's Guide.
 Fergus, Charles. Gun Dog Breeds, A Guide to Spaniels, Retrievers, and Pointing Dogs, The Lyons Press, 2002. 
 Fogle, Dr Bruce. Cocker Spaniel English and American, Dorling Kindersley Limited, 1996.

External links 

 

 Dog breeds originating in England
 FCI breeds
Spaniels
Gundogs

he:קוקר ספניאל